Euchrysops barkeri, the Barker's smoky blue or Barker's Cupid, is a butterfly of the family Lycaenidae. It is found in South Africa, Zimbabwe, Mozambique and from Sierra Leone to Tanzania. In South Africa it is found from the East Cape along the KwaZulu-Natal coast and in Limpopo province.

The wingspan is 26–32 mm for males and 27–33 mm for females. Adults are on wing year-round, but are most common from November to July in South Africa.

The larvae feed on Crotalaria and Rhynchosia species and Vigna unguiculata.

References

Butterflies described in 1893
Euchrysops
Butterflies of Africa